Max Neukirchner (born 20 April 1983 in Stollberg, East Germany) is a professional motorcycle racer currently competing in the Endurance FIM World Championship aboard a Yamaha YZF-R1.

Career

Supersport & Superbike World Championship
In  he competed in the Supersport World Championship riding for Klaffi Honda, finishing the season ranked 9th with 63 points.

For , Neukirchner, along with the Klaffi Honda team, moved to the Superbike World Championship. He got a 3rd place podium finish at Phillip Island (but broke his hand at the next round in Valencia ) and finished the season 12th with 123 points.

He looked set to remain with Klaffi Honda in  but the ride eventually went to Alex Barros. Klaffi wasn't able to find the money to run a second bike for Neukirchner and he was left without a ride. He joined Pedercini Ducati but after a poor first half of the season Neukirchner and Pedercini announced their split. Neukirchner went on to replace Fabien Foret at Alstare Eng. Corona Extra. He finished the season 18th with 28 points.

For  Neukirchner rode for Suzuki Germany and finished the season ranked ninth overall. The team used the 2006-spec works Suzuki GSX-R1000 K6.

For  he rode a 2007-spec Suzuki GSX-R1000 motorcycle for Team Alstare Suzuki. At Valencia he took his first career pole , and lead until the final corner, where he was hit by Carlos Checa, Neukirchner breaking his collarbone. On 27 April 2008 at Assen he achieved his second World Superbike podium finish, finishing behind Troy Bayliss and Checa in the first race .

Neukirchner took his maiden victory (and the first for a German rider) in the first race at Monza, his 70th race in SBK. He won by just 0.058 seconds from Noriyuki Haga. In race 2, he achieved another podium, finishing 2nd to Haga, missing out on victory by 0.009 seconds in a three-way blanket finish. At Miller Motorsport Park he was helped to learn the fastest line through the early part of the track by video of Suzuki's AMA Superbike champion Ben Spies . He did not score another podium that season, but consistent points finishes including four further fourth places allowed him to finish as the top Suzuki in 5th overall.

At Monza he suffered a broken femur in a first-corner crash for which he was blameless.

Although Suzuki Alstare announced in May that he would remain with the team for 2009 and 2010 , doubts later surfaced over his future with the team. On 12 October 2009 Suzuki Alstare announced that they would not be offering Neukirchner a contract extension for the 2010 championship after he failed to provide medical evidence that he was fit to race.

On 14 October 2009 it was confirmed that Neukirchner would race for the HANNspree Ten Kate Honda team for the 2010 season.

Moto2 World Championship

For the 2011 season, Neukirchner rode for the MZ Racing Team with a 2010 FTR chassis at the Moto2 World Championship under the technical direction of the Italian company Pro Ride Motorsports (www.proridegp.com).

For the 2012 season, he was riding for the Kiefer Racing Team with a Kalex chassis at the Moto2 World Championship, but left the series after sustained injury in Brno. Neukirchner achieved his best result and his only point scoring finish of the year at Le Mans with 7th place.

Career highlights

2003- 9th, IDM Supersport Championship #7    Honda CBR600RR
2004- 9th, Supersport World Championship #76    Honda CBR600RR
2005- 12th, Superbike World Championship #76    Ducati 999R
2006- 18th, Superbike World Championship #76    Ducati 999R / Suzuki GSX-R1000
2007- 9th, Superbike World Championship #76    Suzuki GSX-R1000
2008- 5th, Superbike World Championship #76    Suzuki GSX-R1000
2009- 16th, Superbike World Championship #76    Suzuki GSX-R1000
2010- 18th, Superbike World Championship #76    Honda CBR1000RR
2011- 20th, Moto2 World Championship #76    MZ-RE Honda
2012- 26th, Moto2 World Championship #76    Kalex
2013- 14th, Superbike World Championship #27    Ducati 1199 Panigale
2014- 2nd, IDM Superbike Championship #76    Ducati 1199 Panigale
2015- 6th, IDM Superbike Championship #76    Yamaha YZF-R1
2016- 7th, IDM Superbike Championship #76 / 6th, Endurance FIM World Championship #7    Yamaha YZF-R1
2017- Endurance FIM World Championship #7    Yamaha YZF-R1

Career statistics

Grand Prix motorcycle racing

By season

By class

Grand Prix motorcycle racing

Races by year
(key) (Races in bold indicate pole position) (Races in italics indicate fastest lap)

Supersport World Championship

Races by year
(key) (Races in bold indicate pole position) (Races in italics indicate fastest lap)

Superbike World Championship

Races by year
(key) (Races in bold indicate pole position) (Races in italics indicate fastest lap)

References

External links

 max-neukirchner.de Official Website 

1983 births
Living people
People from Stollberg
Superbike World Championship riders
Supersport World Championship riders
German motorcycle racers
Moto2 World Championship riders
Sportspeople from Saxony